The Finland women's national sevens team represents Finland in rugby sevens. They placed fourth at the 2019 and 2021 Rugby Europe Women's Sevens Trophy.

Tournament History

Current squad

Players from the 2022 Training Squad

References

http://rugby.fi/womens-national-team/?lang=en

External links
Finnish Rugby Union Official Site

Women's national rugby sevens teams
R